Moner Moto Manush Pailam Na is a 2019 Bangladeshi drama film written and directed by Zakir Hossain Raju. It features Shakib Khan and Shabnom Bubly in the lead roles. Misha Sawdagor, Fakhrul Bashar Masum, Saberi Alam, Don and others played supporting roles. It is produced by Enamul Haque Arman under the banner of Desh Bangla Multimedia. The film soundtrack is composed by Shafiq Tuhin.

Principal photography began on June 15, 2019, and wrapped up July 24. It was released on August 12, 2019 in Bangladesh on the occasion of Eid al-Adha. The film won several National Film Awards at the 44th National Film Awards including Zakir Hossain Raju's Best Dialogue Award.

Plot

Cast 
 Shakib Khan as Shadhin Chowdhury, a barrister
 Shabnom Bubly as Sultana Haque Arpita, president of Alo Shamajik O Sangsrikitik Sangathan
 Fakhrul Bashar Masum
 Saberi Alam
 Misha Sawdagor as Syed Ehsan
 Don
 Tanami Haque as Jannat

Production
In 2013, the director of the film Zakir Hossain Raju announced to making the film with Shakib Khan and Apu Biswas. Then the Muharat of the film was also held with them. After that, filming started to be delayed.

In 2019, Zakir Hossain Raju changed the cast and story of the film and added Shabnom Bubly to the list of actors instead of Apu Biswas.

Filming
After the filming of three songs from the film Password ended in Turkey in May 2019, two songs from the film Moner Moto Manush Pailam Na were filmed.

The principal photography of the film began on June 15, 2019. Then on June 17 the Muhurat of the film was held for the second time at Dhaka Club in Dhaka. The lead actress of the film Shabnom Bubly was injured during the shooting of the film on June 25. She later received first aid and took part in the shooting of the film from June 26. The filming was completed on July 24, 2019.

Soundtrack 

The film soundtrack composed by Shafiq Tuhin. The first song of the film is "Koto Bhalobashi Tore" was released on YouTube on 28 July 2019 as a promotional single track. The track is written by Shafiq Tuhin himself and sung by Imran Mahmudul and Swaralipi. Then the second track of the film "Pran Juriye Jay" released on August 6. The track is written by director Zakir Hossain Raju and sung by Mahtim Sakib and Kheya. Mahtim Shakib made his debut as a playback singer through the song.  The title track "Moner Moto Manush Pailam Na" released on August 8, 2019 and written by Zakir Hossain Raju and sung by Jahangir Sayeed. Its fourth and last track "E Khancha Vangte Hobe" was released on August 9, 2019. The track is written by Shafiq Tuhin and sung by Lemis. All of songs of the film was released on Khan's YouTube channel SK Films.

Marketing and release
The film official first look poster revealed on August 1, 2019. After that, Its official trailer released on YouTube on August 7, 2019.
On July 30, 2019, the film received clearance from the Censor Board without any cuts.

Release
The film was released on 15 August 2019 in 154 theaters in Bangladesh on the occasion of Eid al-adha.

Reception

Critical response 
Rumman Rashid Khan on Bangla Movie Database praised the performance of the lead characters of the film but criticized it for the success of the name. He wrote, "The director could have make a smart film in a modern screenplay with this story with more care by editing, working with the camera or taking time off."

Awards and nominations

Home video 
The film revealed on online streaming platform Bongo BD on the occasion on New Year of 2021 on 31 December 2020.

References

External links 
 
 

Bengali-language Bangladeshi films
2010s Bengali-language films
Films about social issues in Bangladesh